Everlife is the second studio album by Everlife. It was released on August 24, 2004.

This is Everlife's second studio album on Tovah/Shelter Records and was distributed by Word Distribution. Since it was a lesser-known album and released by two small labels, it is considered to be an indie album and that is why the Hollywood Records release is being promoted as their second album, although this album is their second studio album.

Track listing 
All songs written by Amber Ross, Dan Needham and Kevan Cyka.  Co-writers listed below.
 "Heaven Open Your Eyes" 3:24
 "Take a Ride" (Tony Palacios) 3:43
 "I'm Over It" 3:33
 "Evidence" 4:08
 "Lead the Way" (Chris Omartian) 3:47
 "Save Me" 4:22
 "Even When" 3:10
 "Set Me Free" (Linda Ellas) 3:09
 "Getting Closer" (Jayden Maria, Lynn Nichols) 3:49
 "Angels Cry" 4:02

Notes
 The singles released for the promotion of the album were: "Evidence", "Heaven Open Your Eyes" and "I'm Over It".
 "I'm Over It"  was included thanks to Disney Channel Records in the album "Disney Jams Vol. 7". This helped Everlife to start collaborating in different soundtracks.

References

2004 debut albums
Everlife albums